Daniel Kastler (4 March 1926 – 4 July 2015) was a French theoretical physicist, working on the foundations of quantum field theory and on non-commutative geometry.

Biography 
Daniel Kastler was born on March 4, 1926, in Colmar, a city of north-eastern France. He is the son of the Physics Nobel Prize laureate Alfred Kastler. In 1946 he enrolled at the École Normale Superieure in Paris. In 1950 he moved to Germany and became lecturer at the Saarland University. In 1953, he was promoted to associate professor and obtained a doctorate in quantum chemistry. In 1957 Kastler moved to the University of Aix-Marseille and became a full professor in 1959. In 1968 he founded, together with Jean-Marie Souriau and Andrea Visconti, the Center of Theoretical Physics in Marseille. Daniel Kastler died on July 8, 2015, in Bandol, in southern France.

Daniel Kastler is known in particular for his work with Rudolf Haag on the foundation of the algebraic approach to quantum field theory. Their collaboration started at the famous Lille Conference in 1957, where both were present, and culminated in the Haag–Kastler axioms for local observables of quantum field theories. This framework uses elements of the theory of operator algebras and is therefore referred to as algebraic quantum field theory or, from the physical point of view, as local quantum physics. In other collaborations, Kastler showed the importance of C*-algebras in the foundations of quantum statistical mechanics and in abelian asymptotic systems. In the 1980s he started working on Alain Connes' non-commutative geometry, especially studying the applications in elementary particle physics. In the same period Kastler, in collaboration with Raymond Stora, developed the geometrical setting for the BRST transformations for the quantization of gauge theories.

Honors and awards 
In 1984 Daniel Kastler was awarded the Prix Ampère of the French Academy of Sciences. Since 1977 he was a corresponding member of the Göttingen Academy of Sciences and since 1981 of the Austrian Academy of Sciences. Since 1995 he was a member of the German National Academy of Sciences Leopoldina.

Selected publications

See also 

 Axiomatic quantum field theory
 Hilbert's sixth problem
 Kadison–Kastler metric
 Local quantum physics
 Non-commutative geometry
 Quantum field theory

References

Further reading

External links

 .
 .
 Kastler's genealogy at kastler.net

20th-century French physicists
21st-century French physicists
Theoretical physicists
Members of the Austrian Academy of Sciences
Members of the German Academy of Sciences Leopoldina
1926 births
2015 deaths